Bigheads is a British television game show produced by Primal Media that aired on ITV From 23 April 2017 until 28 May 2017 and is hosted by Jason Manford with Jenny Powell and Kriss Akabusi as commentators. Contestants were dressed as celebrities with oversized heads that designed to be based from Spitting Image and Newzoids by competing in challenges and were eliminated until a winner was decided.

In March 2018, the show was cancelled after one series.

Format
Contestants are dressed as celebrities with oversized heads and compete in various challenges until a winner is found. It has been described as "It's a Knockout meets Spitting Image".

Series overview

Series 1 (2017)

Episode 1
Episode 1 was broadcast on 23 April 2017.

Episode 2
Episode 2 was broadcast on 30 April 2017.

Episode 3
Episode 3 was broadcast on 7 May 2017.

Episode 4
Episode 4 was broadcast on 14 May 2017.

Episode 5
Episode 5 was broadcast on 21 May 2017.

Episode 6: Series Final
Episode 6 was broadcast on 28 May 2017.

Ratings

References

External links

2017 British television series debuts
2017 British television series endings
2010s British game shows
ITV game shows
Television series by Sony Pictures Television
English-language television shows
Television shows shot at Elstree Film Studios